Metro-Goldwyn-Mayer Home Entertainment LLC (d/b/a MGM Home Entertainment and formerly known as MGM Home Video, MGM/CBS Home Video and MGM/UA Home Video) was the home video division of the American media company Metro-Goldwyn-Mayer (MGM), whose titles are exclusively distributed by Warner Bros. Home Entertainment.

History

1978–1982 
In 1978, the company was established as MGM Home Video, releasing MGM films and TV shows. In 1980, MGM joined forces with CBS Video Enterprises, the home video division of the CBS television network, and established MGM/CBS Home Video. In October of that year, they released their first batch of Betamax and VHS tapes.

The initial printings of all 24 films were packaged in brown leather clamshell cases with gold lettering; they were presented to CBS executives. Later printings of these films, as well as all printings of later releases by MGM/CBS, were packaged in oversized gray book-style boxes with either the MGM Abstract Lion print logo or CBS Video print logo in the upper right hand corner of the packaging. MGM/CBS also issued some early tapes of Lorimar product; those releases would instead bear the Lorimar print logo where the MGM or CBS Video print logo would normally be.

In 1981, MGM/CBS and Samuel Goldwyn Home Entertainment co-marketed five titles, mainly independent titles, with CBS Video Enterprises handling distribution of its titles.

1982–1998 
In 1982, a year after MGM bought and merged with the near-bankrupt United Artists from Transamerica, CBS dropped out of the video partnership with MGM and moved to 20th Century Fox to create CBS/Fox Video. MGM's video division became known as MGM/UA Home Entertainment Group, Inc., more commonly known as MGM/UA Home Video. MGM/UA continued to license pre-1981 UA and pre-1950 WB films (as well as some post-1981 titles) to CBS/Fox (due to an agreement UA had with Fox years earlier dating back to when CBS/Fox Video was called Magnetic Video). In 1982, the company entered into an agreement with The Cannon Group to release titles from the mini-major film studio through 1985. In 1985, it entered into an agreement with Rene Malo Video to handle Canadian distribution of MGM/UA product.

In 1986, MGM's pre-May 1986 library (also including the pre-1950 Warner Bros. library, Bugs Bunny: Superstar, the Fleischer Studios/Famous Studios Popeye cartoons, and most US rights to the RKO Pictures library), was acquired by Ted Turner and his company Turner Entertainment Co. After the library was acquired, MGM/UA signed a deal with Turner to continue distributing the pre-May 1986 MGM and to begin distributing the pre-1950 Warner Bros. libraries for video release (the rest of the library went to Turner Home Entertainment).

That year, it inked an agreement with Roger Corman and his film studio Concorde Pictures that enabled MGM/UA worldwide access to motion pictures that was produced by his Concorde film studio.

In October 1990, after Pathé Communications bought MGM, MGM/UA Home Video struck a deal with Warner Home Video to have them distribute MGM/UA titles exclusively on home video. The Pathé merger also meant MGM acquired a majority of the Cannon Films library (certain rights for other media and select films during the Thorn EMI merger now lie with other entities with few exceptions), ironic considering MGM/UA had previously distributed Cannon output in the 1980s. MGM/UA also began distributing the rest of the UA library around this time after its contract with CBS/Fox ended. In 1994, MGM/UA Home Video launched the MGM/UA Family Entertainment label for family-friendly releases. In 1996, Warner made an exclusive deal with Image Entertainment to distribute MGM/UA titles on LaserDisc. 

In 1997, MGM/UA, along with the other studios that were distributed by Warner Home Video, began releasing its titles on DVD. Some of the films MGM released on DVD were from the Turner catalog, which they were still allowed to keep after Turner merged into Time Warner some time before because of their distribution deal. That same year, MGM acquired Orion Pictures. As a result, Orion Home Video (Orion's home video division) was absorbed by MGM/UA, and was retained as an in-name-only division until the acquisition deal was finalized in 1998. That year, the company was renamed MGM Home Entertainment.

1998–2005 
After the Orion merger, MGM kept Orion intact as a corporation, mostly to avoid its video distribution agreement with Warner Home Video, and began distributing Orion Pictures films under the Orion Home Video label. MGM acquired the 2/3 of pre-1996 PolyGram Filmed Entertainment library from Seagram in 1999 for $250 million, increasing their library holdings to 4,000. The PolyGram libraries (which included the Epic film library) were purchased by its Orion Pictures subsidiary so as to avoid its 1990 video distribution agreement with Warner. In March 1999, MGM bought out its distribution contract with Warner Bros. for $225 million, effectively ending the distribution problem; the initial deal was to have expired in 2003, but instead it would end in February 2000. As a result of the deal, MGM gave up the home video rights to the MGM/UA films owned by Turner to Warner Home Video. Upon the expiration of the Warner deal, MGM sold overseas video rights to 20th Century Fox Home Entertainment.

In 2001, MGM and Amazon.com launched the "MGM Movie Vault" to distribute VHS copies of selected films, either previously unreleased on video or long out-of-print, exclusively through Amazon.

On March 3, 2003, MGM Home Entertainment launched the MGM Kids sub-label.

On May 27, 2003, MGM reinstated full distribution rights to their products in regions like Australia, Netherlands, Belgium, France, Germany and the United Kingdom, although Fox would continue to distribute for MGM in a majority of developing regions.

2005–2019 
In 2005, following MGM's acquisition by the Sony-led consortium, MGM released its newest content through Sony Pictures Home Entertainment under the standard MGM label.

In 2006, after MGM ended its distribution agreement with Sony, the company announced that it would sign a new distribution deal with 20th Century Fox Home Entertainment. Originally, DVD releases of MGM/UA and Columbia TriStar co-releases continued to be distributed by SPHE, since Sony then still owned 20% of MGM, whereas Fox has no controlling interest; however, Fox has since released DVD editions of films based on MGM IPs.

In 2010, parent company Metro-Goldwyn-Mayer emerged from bankruptcy. As of 2011 until 2018, MGM no longer released or marketed their own movies. Instead, MGM shared distribution with other studios that handle all distribution and marketing for MGM's projects. Since then, only a handful of MGM's most recent movies, such as Skyfall, Red Dawn, Carrie, RoboCop, If I Stay, Poltergeist (which Fox 2000 Pictures co-produced) and Spectre have all been released on DVD and Blu-ray by its home video output via 20th Century Fox Home Entertainment. Others, such as The Hobbit trilogy, Hansel & Gretel: Witch Hunters, G.I. Joe: Retaliation, Hercules, Hot Tub Time Machine 2, Tomb Raider, Creed I and II, 21 and 22 Jump Street, Ben-Hur, Sherlock Gnomes and The Magnificent Seven have been released by the home video output of the co-distributor—in these cases, Warner Bros. Home Entertainment (which MGM's catalog is currently handled by), Paramount Home Entertainment and Sony Pictures Home Entertainment respectively.

In 2011, MGM launched the "MGM Limited Edition Collection", a manufactured-on-demand (MOD) DVD service that issues unreleased and out-of-print titles from the MGM-owned library. Its releases are sold through the Warner Archive Collection.

On April 14, 2011, Fox's deal distributing the MGM library was extended through 2016. On June 27, 2016, Fox's distribution deal with MGM was renewed until June 30, 2020.

2019–present 
With the acquisition of Fox's parent company 21st Century Fox by Disney on March 20, 2019, MGM announced in their 2019 report that it would not renew its deal with Fox after the current agreement expired on June 30, 2020, and would search for a new distributor afterwards. In the studio's 2020 financial report, MGM named Warner Bros. Home Entertainment as their new home media distributor.

On May 26, 2021, it was officially announced that MGM will be acquired by Amazon for $8.45 billion, subject to regulatory approvals and other routine closing conditions; with the studio continuing to operate as a label under the new parent company, but leaving the future of the physical home video releases of its title other than its current distribution deal with Studio Distribution Services in question. The merger was finalized on March 17, 2022.

Catalog and distribution deals 
Currently in the United States and Canada, MGM's catalog is distributed by Studio Distribution Services, LLC., a joint venture between Warner Bros. Home Entertainment and Universal Pictures Home Entertainment that was first announced on January 14, 2020, later revealing the name on April 23, 2021, and marketed by Warner, with Warner also handling distribution internationally. Warner already owns and distributes MGM's pre-May 1986 library through their ownership of Turner Entertainment Co., but the former began a distribution deal with the latter for its remaining catalog titles and select UAR releases when the latter left 20th Century Fox Home Entertainment – a prior distribution deal that began in 2006 – on June 30, 2020, and Universal already began distributing some of UAR's other releases beginning with Operation Finale on December 4, 2018. MGM also licenses out some of its film and television library to Kino Lorber, the Criterion Collection, Shout! Factory and Vinegar Syndrome.

Many of Orion Pictures' films since its revival have been released through various third-party companies. The remake of The Town That Dreaded Sundown was released by Image Entertainment. However, 20th Century, and later on Warner Bros. (via SDS, LLC.) would handle home video distribution of Orion's movies released through UAR.

Current distribution deals 
 Studio Distribution Services
 Warner Bros. Home Entertainment (1990–1999; 2020–present for the MGM library, including its post-April 1986 & the pre-UAR films; the studio's pre-May 1986 library remained with Warner Bros. through Turner Entertainment)
 Universal Pictures Home Entertainment (2018–2022 for MGM films released through United Artists Releasing; 2022–present for select Orion Pictures films)

Past distribution deals 
 Sony Pictures Home Entertainment (2005–06)
 20th Century Fox Home Entertainment (2006–20)

References 

Home video companies of the United States
Home video distributors
Metro-Goldwyn-Mayer subsidiaries
Entertainment companies based in California
Companies that filed for Chapter 11 bankruptcy in 2010
Entertainment companies established in the 1970s
1970s establishments in California